Salicylaldoxime is an organic compound described by the formula C6H4CH=NOH-2-OH.  It is the oxime of salicylaldehyde.  This crystalline, colorless solid is a chelator and sometimes used in the analysis of samples containing transition metal ions, with which it often forms brightly coloured coordination complexes.

Reactions
Salicylaldoxime is the conjugate acid of a bidentate ligand:
2 C6H4CH=NOH-2-OH  +  Cu2+   →   Cu(C6H4CH=NOH-2-O)2  +  2 H+
In highly acidic media, the ligand protonates, and the metal aquo complex and aldoxime are liberated.  In this way the ligand is used as a recyclable extractant.
It typically forms charge-neutral complexes with divalent metal ions.

Analytical chemistry

In the era when metals were analysed by spectrophotometry, many chelating ligands were developed that selectively formed brightly coloured complexes with particular metal ions.  This methodology has been eclipsed with the introduction of inductively coupled plasma methodology.  Salicylaldoxime can be used to selectively precipitate metal ions for gravimetric determination.  It forms a greenish-yellow precipitate with copper at a pH of 2.6 in the presence of acetic acid.  Under these conditions, this is the only metal that precipitates; at pH 3.3, nickel also precipitates.  Iron (III) will interfere.
  It has been used as an ionophore in ion selective electrodes, with good response to Pb2+ and Ni2+.

Extraction of metals
Saloximes are used in the extraction and separation of metals from their ores. In one application of hydrometallurgy, Cu2+ is extracted into organic solvents as its saloxime complex.

External links
 Chemical data at NIST Chemistry WebBook

References

Phenols
Analytical chemistry
Aldoximes